Free is a studio album by jazz bassist Marcus Miller, released in 2007.

Background 
The album's title track is a cover of the 1977 Deniece Williams song. UK soul singer Corinne Bailey Rae provided lead vocals. "Higher Ground" is a song originally recorded by Stevie Wonder, and "What Is Hip" was originally performed by Tower of Power. "Jean Pierre" was originally performed by Miles Davis on We Want Miles, 1982.  Blues singer Keb' Mo' performs lead vocals and co-wrote with Marcus Miller the track entitled "Milky Way".

The album's US version has not only a new title, Marcus, but the tracks have been remixed/recut. Four additional tracks have been added to the album as well.

Track listing
All tracks produced by Marcus Miller; except where indicated
"Blast"
"Funk Joint"
"Free" (Deneice Williams, Hank Redd, Nathan Watts, Susaye Greene)
"Strum"
"Milky Way" (Miller, Kevin R. Moore)
"Pluck (Interlude)"
"When I Fall in Love" (Edward Heyman, Victor Young)
"Jean Pierre" (Miles Davis)
"Higher Ground" (Stevie Wonder)
"What Is Hip?" (David Garibaldi, Emilio Castillo, Stephen M. Kupka)

Personnel
Marcus Miller - bass, fretless bass, guitar, bass clarinet, keyboards, organ, synthesizer, string synthesizer, Moog synthesizer, Fender Rhodes electric piano, Wurlitzer electric piano, clavinet, clarinet, sitar, percussion, tambourine, programming, drum programming
Andrea Braido - guitar
Paul Jackson Jr. - acoustic guitar
Bobby Sparks, Bernard Wright - synthesizer
Chester Thompson - organ
Charles "Poogie" Bell, Jason Thomas, Teddy Campbell - drums
Julian Miller - percussion programming 
Gregoire Maret - harmonica 
Keith Anderson, Tom Scott - tenor saxophone
David Sanborn - alto saxophone
Michael "Patches" Stewart - trumpet, flugelhorn
Lalah Hathaway - vocals on "Blast", "ba da yap" vocals on "Free"
Corinne Bailey Rae - vocals on "Free"
Keb' Mo - sample vocals on "Pluck"
Kenya Ivey, Tavia Ivey, Ulisa Ivey, Gussie Miller - backing vocals

External links 
 

2007 albums
Marcus Miller albums
Albums produced by Marcus Miller